Myrick House is a historic home located in the Murfreesboro Historic District at Murfreesboro, Hertford County, North Carolina.  It was built about 1805, and is a two-story, five bay, Federal style brick dwelling with a low hip roof and interior end chimneys.  The front facade features a one-story hip roofed front porch supported by four fluted columns.  It has a one-story, frame rear wing.  It was built by James Morgan, a prominent local merchant.

It was listed on the National Register of Historic Places in 1971.

References

Houses on the National Register of Historic Places in North Carolina
Federal architecture in North Carolina
Houses completed in 1805
Houses in Hertford County, North Carolina
National Register of Historic Places in Hertford County, North Carolina
1805 establishments in North Carolina
Historic district contributing properties in North Carolina
Buildings and structures in Murfreesboro, North Carolina